Xu Qinan (born 4 March 1936) is a Chinese engineer and general designer of deep-sea research submersible Jiaolong. He is an academician of the Chinese Academy of Engineering (CAE).

Biography
Xu was born in Shanghai, on March 4, 1936, while his ancestral home is in Zhenhai District of Ningbo, Zhejiang. After graduating from Shanghai Jiao Tong University in 1958, he was assigned to the China Shipbuilding Industry Corporation.

He was elected an academician of the Chinese Academy of Engineering on December 19, 2013.

Personal life
Xu married Fang Zhifen, their children and grandchildren live in the United States.

Awards
 First Prize of the National Science and Technology Progress Award
 Second Prize of the National Science and Technology Progress Award
 Science and Technology Award of the Ho Leung Ho Lee Foundation

References

1936 births
Living people
Engineers from Shanghai
Shanghai Jiao Tong University alumni
Members of the Chinese Academy of Engineering
Chinese naval architects